The Excellence in Science Award was established by the Federation of American Societies for Experimental Biology (FASEB) in 1989 to recognize outstanding achievement by women in biological science.  All women who are members of one or more of the societies of FASEB are eligible for nomination.  Nominations recognize a woman whose career achievements have contributed significantly to further our understanding of a particular discipline by excellence in research. 

The award includes a $10,000 unrestricted research grant, funded by Eli Lilly and Company.

Award recipients
Source: FASEB
 1989 Marian Koshland
 1990 Elizabeth Hay
 1991 Ellen Vitetta
 1992 Bettie Sue Masters
 1993 Susan Leeman
 1994 Lucille Shapiro
 1995 Philippa Marrack
 1996 Zena Werb
 1997 Claude Klee
 1998 Eva Neer
 1999 Helen Blau
 2000 Peng Loh
 2001 Laurie Glimcher
 2002 Phyllis Wise
 2003 Joan A. Steitz
 2004 Janet Rossant
 2005 Anita Roberts
 2006 Marilyn Farquhar and Elaine Fuchs
 2007 Frances Arnold
 2008 Mina J. Bissell
 2009 Susan L. Lindquist
 2010 Susan S. Taylor
 2011 Gail R. Martin
 2012 Susan R. Wessler
 2013 Terry Orr-Weaver
 2014 Kathryn V. Anderson
 2015 Diane Griffin
 2016 Bonnie Bassler
 2017 Diane Mathis
 2018 Lynne E. Maquat
 2019 Barbara B. Kahn
 2020 :
 Lifetime Achievement : Brigid Hogan
 Mid-Career Investigator : Aviv Regev
 Early-Career Investigator : Karen Schindler
 2021: 
 Lifetime Achievement : M. Celeste Simon
 Mid-Career Investigator : Valentina Greco
 Early-Career Investigator : Cigall Kadoch

See also

 List of biology awards

References

Biology awards
Science awards honoring women
American science and technology awards
Awards established in 1989
1989 establishments in the United States